Horbury Town Football Club is a football club based in Horbury, West Yorkshire, England. They play at the Slazengers Sports Complex.

History
The club entered the West Yorkshire Association League in 2005, five years after a club of the same name had last played in the competition. They won the Second Division title in 2007, and in 2013 were promoted to the Premier Division after finishing third in the First Division. In 2022, they were promoted to the Northern Counties East League.

Honours
West Yorkshire Association League
Division Two champions 2006-07

Notes

Football clubs in England
Football clubs in West Yorkshire
West Yorkshire Association Football League
Northern Counties East Football League